SardarSamand, is a lake formed by dam built across the Sukri river and Guhiya Nala, which are tributaries of Luni River. It was built with the cost of around 8 Lakhs rupees and was named after the Maharaja of Jodhpur, Sardar Singh. Its construction started in 1899 and completed in 1905–06. It is situated in Pali district of Rajasthan.

Dam
The lake is formed by three earthen dams, with total length of 27,252 feet, maximum of height of 31.5 feet and maximum depth is 25.5 feet. The tank was built to irrigate over 18,000 acres of land, after a good rainfall. Catchment area of Sardar Samand is 800 sq. miles and surface area (when full) is 13 sq. miles. Its capacity is, 3500 million cubic feet and length of canals and distributaries is 30 miles.

This lake was under consideration as a seaplane base for the Imperial Airways Karachi-Calcutta route, but due to less water, Rajsamand was given the preference.

Village
The village developed around the lake is also known as Sardar Samand. It is under Sojat Tehsil of Pali district. Sardar Samand village Pin code is 306401. Total area of the village is 3,204.10 Hectare. As per 2011 Census, total population of the village is, 1269 and number of houses are 277. Female Population is 48.2%.

Afforestation experiment 
Sardar Samand was the place of experimentation of artificial afforestation in the barren land, by planting cassia auriculate and Prosopis Juliflora in a closed fenced area and the area soon turned different from the surroundings.

Irrigation 
Main purpose of construction of this dam was irrigation. Currently, the lake provides irrigation to over 50,000 farmers when full. From Sardar Samand, there is a 30 km long canal, which stretches up to Bandai, near Rohat.

Sardar Samand Lake Palace 
Situated on a hill, the Sardar Samand Lake Palace was commissioned by Maharaja Umaid Singh in 1933. It was designed by the state architect, George Goldstraw. It was built as an Art deco hunting lodge and now turned into a Heritage Hotel. It also houses a vast collection of African trophies.

Connectivity 
Under Rajasthan State Highway Developmental Project-2, State Highway 61 connects Jodhpur to Marwar Junction and Jojawar and passes through Sardar Samand, providing better connectivity to the town.

Bird watching
Sardar Samand is also known for sightings of migratory birds like Greater Flamingos, Great White Pelicans, Bar-headed Geese, Kurjan (Demoiselle cranes) and other species of ducks and geese.
There are black bucks and other fauna found in its surroundings, which attract bird lovers and wildlife enthusiasts.

References

External links 

 Sardar Samand Lake Palace

Lakes of Rajasthan
Artificial lakes of India
Villages in Pali district